Pleurotus abieticola is an edible species of fungus in the family Pleurotaceae, described as new to science by mycologists R.H. Petersen & K.W. Hughes in 1997. It grows on rotten wood of Picea in subalpine forests dominated by it. It can be cultivated. Phylogenetic research has shown that while it belongs to P. ostreatus clade, it forms its own intersterility group.

See also 
 List of Pleurotus species

References

External links 
 

Fungi described in 1997
Pleurotaceae